The Circle of Time is the fourth album by American pianist Amina Claudine Myers featuring performances recorded in 1983 for the Italian Black Saint label.

Reception
The Allmusic review by Michael G. Nastos awarded the album 4½ stars stating "Myers freely explores jazz, blues, and gospel-tinged creative music in her own inimitable way. All of these six pieces were written by Myers, each showcasing a different side of her joyous persona, making her music deep, listenable, tuneful, and emotional".

Track listing
All compositions by Amina Claudine Myers
 "Louisville" - 6:50 
 "Plowed Fields" - 7:08 
 "Do You Wanna Be Saved" - 8:13 
 "Christine" - 8:58 
 "The Clock" - 6:26 
 "The Circle of Time" - 6:43
Recorded at Barigozzi Studio in Milano, Italy on February 3 & 4, 1983

Personnel
Amina Claudine Myers - piano, organ, harmonica, vocals
Don Pate - bass, electric bass
Thurman Barker - percussion

References

External links 

 

Black Saint/Soul Note albums
Amina Claudine Myers albums
1983 albums